Resorts World Las Vegas is a resort, mall, and casino on the Las Vegas Strip in Winchester, Nevada, United States. The property had been the site of the Stardust Resort and Casino until 2007, when Boyd Gaming demolished the resort to develop its Echelon Place project. Boyd halted construction in 2008 due to poor economic conditions and sold the property to Genting Group in March 2013. Genting immediately announced plans to redevelop the site as Resorts World Las Vegas, part of its Resorts World brand. The project re-used some of the partially finished Echelon buildings, including hotel and parking garage structures.

Groundbreaking was initially scheduled for 2014, with the first phase expected to open in 2016. However, the opening date was delayed several times due to redesigns of the project. Groundbreaking took place in May 2015, and construction began in late 2017. Further design changes were made after Wynn Resorts filed a lawsuit against Genting, alleging that Resorts World was too similar to the nearby Wynn/Encore properties. Wynn had accused Genting of misleading its visitors into believing that Resorts World was affiliated with the Wynn properties.

Resorts World opened on June 24, 2021. It is the first new resort to be completed on the Las Vegas Strip since the Cosmopolitan, which opened in 2010. At a cost of $4.3 billion, Resorts World is the most expensive resort property ever developed in Las Vegas. The resort includes a  casino and a 59-story tower housing three Hilton hotels: the Las Vegas Hilton at Resorts World, with 1,774 rooms; Conrad Las Vegas at Resorts World, with 1,496 rooms; and Crockfords Las Vegas, with 236 rooms.

History
In 2007, Boyd Gaming demolished its Stardust Resort and Casino on the northern Las Vegas Strip to develop Echelon Place, but construction was halted during the economic downturn of 2008. Four years later, Boyd Gaming began negotiations to sell the  site to the Malaysia-based Genting Group. After months of negotiating, the site was sold to Genting for $350 million on March 4, 2013. On the same day, as part of its Resorts World brand, Genting Group announced plans to build the Chinese-themed Resorts World Las Vegas on the site, while using some of the unfinished Echelon buildings for the new project.

The first phase of the project would total , including a  casino spread across several floors, and a hotel with at least 3,500 rooms. Groundbreaking was scheduled for 2014, with the first phase scheduled to open in 2016. Genting expected to spend between $2 billion and $7 billion to complete the entire project.

Resorts World Las Vegas was designed by Paul Steelman's architectural firm, Steelman Partners. Conceptual drawings depicted seven hotel towers that would surround the complex. It would be the largest Asian-themed resort on the Las Vegas Strip, and its target clientele would be middle-income residents of Asia. The project was expected to revitalize the northern portion of the Las Vegas Strip, although some analysts were concerned that the local hotel market had already been saturated, with more than 150,000 rooms. Genting Group paid $4 million per acre for the site, down from previous years when land on the Strip sometimes sold for a minimum of $17 million per acre.

Genting chose the site because of its size and location, and the fact that it included some partially built structures from the Echelon project, which would shorten the resort's construction period. Echelon's foundations and partially built hotel towers, as well as an unfinished Echelon parking garage on the property's southwest corner, would be incorporated into the new project. Paul Steelman stated that 90 percent of the foundations for the Echelon project had already been completed by Boyd Gaming. Before purchasing the Echelon property, Genting had considered building a resort on the former nearby site of the New Frontier Hotel and Casino.

Genting was known to proceed slowly and quietly on some of its projects, as it did with Resorts World Las Vegas. Much of the final design work and planning was done privately. Early plans stated that the entire project would contain  upon completion, including four hotel towers and a total of 6,648 rooms. The towers would be between 44 and 57 stories, with a maximum height of 679 feet.

In December 2013, it was announced that the first phase was expected to cost $4 billion. The project would be developed over several years, through two or three phases. As of May 2014, the first phase would include 3,000 hotel rooms in a 674-foot tower, a casino with a total of 3,500 slot machines and table games, and 30 food and beverage outlets. Other attractions would include a large garden marking the property's entrance and a  aquarium measuring 58 feet in height and containing various exotic fish. A shopping center resembling a Chinese village would be located along the property facing the Las Vegas Strip.

Construction was expected to begin later in 2014, with completion of the first phase expected to take 24 to 36 months. The project was expected to incorporate 80 to 85 percent of the old Echelon buildings. Genting had plans to eventually add three additional hotels to the project and possibly a theme park through future phases. Plans for a panda exhibit were still considered, but the company mentioned the difficulties in obtaining a panda permit from the Chinese government.

Redesigns and delays
Genting delayed the resort's 2014 groundbreaking date to continue finalizing design plans for the project, with the first phase now expected to open in late 2017. The groundbreaking ceremony took place on May 5, 2015, with a new expected opening date of mid-2018. The ceremony included lion dancers, and was attended by approximately 250 people, including Nevada governor Brian Sandoval, lieutenant governor Mark Hutchison, U.S. Representative Cresent Hardy, Clark County Commissioners Steve Sisolak and Chris Giunchigliani, and Steve and Elaine Wynn.

At the time, Paul Steelman said, "It's a Chinese-themed resort, but it's not a themed resort in the sense that we're sitting around trying to copy Tiananmen Square and make it a dusty old replica. It's not a fully-themed, over-the-top kind of thing where we're trying to copy every single thing in China." It was also announced that the resort would be known in Chinese as "Genting's World of China". The first phase would consist of the main hotel tower. The resort's panda habitat and water park were moved to the second phase of construction, and a 4,000-seat theater had also been moved to a future phase.

Following the groundbreaking, the project had approximately 100 construction workers engaged in site preparation. During the local summer of 2015, construction took place in the mornings and at night so that workers could avoid the summer heat. In October 2015, construction workers topped off half of the parking structure originally meant for Echelon. Up to that time, Genting had spent more than $50 million on construction and other work, including property maintenance.

Little construction had occurred up to that time, as Genting was awaiting various permits, including those needed for energy, sewer and water systems. In the meantime, the company continued to develop its plans for the rest of the project. Genting spokesman Michael Levoff stated that Resorts World Las Vegas was "one of the most cutting-edge and ambitious projects to be undertaken in the Las Vegas Strip in the last decade. A $4 billion project will not be built overnight; it requires a rigorous planning and approval process." The project would be partially financed with nearly $1 billion contributed by foreign investors through the EB-5 program.

In January 2016, the Clark County Zoning Commission approved the project, which would have a Forbidden City design and was expected to eventually include more than 7,000 rooms in four high-rise hotels. The first phase would also include a  lake, part of a Chinese garden, which would be overlooked by a row of restaurants. The project's arena would remain part of a future phase. Work on the parking garage continued as of February 2016, but construction was otherwise non-existent.

It was announced that activity on the site would begin in mid-2016, with full construction beginning towards the end of the year. The 56-story hotel tower and a  casino were now expected to open in early 2019. The delay was attributed to ongoing work on the project's designs. Other factors were struggles with the devaluation of Malaysian currency and in the Chinese economy. At the time, the resort was expected to include a "celestial sphere" which would display guests' selfie images, a feature that was expected to appeal to millennial customers.

By July 2016, Genting was finalizing designs for the hotel tower and the casino floor, ahead of plans to complete foundation work. In October 2016, approximately 30 people were on the site performing minor construction work. That month, PETA wrote a letter to Genting's chairman, Lim Kok Thay, pleading for him to have the resort's panda exhibit removed from the project. Genting stated that the exhibit had already been removed from the project "a long time ago." The planned water park and Great Wall replica were also removed from the final project.

Construction cranes were expected to be placed at the site in early 2017, but their unavailability delayed the start of construction. In May 2017, the resort's opening was delayed to 2020 after the project was redesigned to attract younger gamblers. The installation of cranes and the start of construction was expected within three months. The parking garage had already been finished, and was to be used by the eventual 5,000 construction workers. Edward Farrell, a casino industry executive who had just been announced as the first president of the resort, said that the project's earlier design "had a lot of traditional, older Chinese architecture and elements that were within it. The company has really taken a look at the market in Las Vegas throughout the past couple of years, and it has really shifted to something that's much more modern. [...] much more Shanghai than maybe Beijing, with technology and a modern looking feel."

Farrell further stated that the company went "back and forth on a lot of design elements. [...] The more modern Chinese theme fits in more to where we're really going with this resort. When we open up, we'll use the newest and most recent technology and have appeal to people over the next 30, 40, 50 years." Farrell also said that the design phase was nearing its end and that, "We've done a lot of construction that nobody has seen over the last two or three years — not exciting stuff, like utility lines, working out easements and building a garage with some office space." Upcoming construction would focus on the hotel towers and the casino structure.

Construction and lawsuit

In October 2017, W.A. Richardson Builders was announced as the project's construction manager. That month, demolition began on some steel beams and concrete left from the Echelon project that would not be used in Genting's plans for Resorts World. Cranes were expected to be installed at the site over the following eight weeks, and the resort's opening was expected for late 2020. The hotel towers, adjacent to the eventual casino, were 10 stories tall at the time. Upon completion, the towers were to stand 56 stories and 679 feet, slightly taller than the Wynn Las Vegas resort, located just southeast of Resorts World on the other side of South Las Vegas Boulevard. It was expected that the towers would progress one floor every eight days during construction, which began later in 2017. As of October 2018, the project had reached the 35th floor. More than 1,000 construction workers engaged in steel, concrete, and glasswork throughout the site. Thousands of additional construction workers were expected to be on-site by mid-2019.

In December 2018, Wynn Resorts filed a federal trademark infringement lawsuit against Genting, alleging similarities between Resorts World and the Wynn/Encore properties. Alleged similarities included a curved facade and horizontal lines between panels of bronze glass. Wynn Resorts alleged that Genting planned to profit by misleading visitors of Resorts World into believing that it was affiliated with Wynn's properties. Wynn Resorts also alleged that someone involved in Resorts World Las Vegas had requested a local architect to produce a design for the project that would be identical or similar to Wynn's resorts.

In January 2019, attorneys for Resorts World Las Vegas responded to the lawsuit, stating that the project had nearly two years to go before its opening and that it currently consisted of "a bare, skeletal structure covered by a few floors of window paneling," stating that once the resort was completed, it would look "dramatically different from Wynn's properties, dispelling any suggestion that a reasonable consumer could confuse the two resorts for each other."

Attorneys for the project also stated that renderings of the building had been shown to Wynn executives during July 2018. Since then, the building's design had been modified, with the earlier design being "more similar to Wynn's than the current" design. Resorts World attorneys further stated, "Given that Wynn was aware at least six months ago of (Resorts World Las Vegas) design renderings that arguably looked more similar to Wynn's properties than do the current renderings, its heavy-handed, holiday-timed filing appears more directed at shutting down construction of a business competitor than avoiding any hypothetical confusion of customers two years down the road." New renderings of the project, created in January 2019 after the lawsuit was filed, showed the resort with red and orange facades. Wynn Resorts stated that the new renderings "are merely drawings which do not reflect the actual construction directly across the street from our resort. We will continue to pursue our legal claims and injunctive relief in this matter."

Wynn Resorts sought a temporary restraining order against the project with the potential to shut down construction. Resorts World stated that the halt of construction would delay the installation of glass panels and could cost an estimated $169 million, with immediate layoffs of 500 construction workers, out of a total of 1,500 workers involved with the project. Wynn Resorts and Genting eventually settled the dispute at the end of January 2019; the latter agreed to have its design team make several changes to the project to differentiate it from the Wynn properties.

In May 2019, Scott Sibella was named the resort's new president, replacing Farrell, who was named president of Genting's US-based operations. Sibella was previously the president and chief operating officer of the MGM Grand for eight years. At the time, construction on the conjoined 59-story hotel towers had reached the 55th floor. The project was topped off in mid-August 2019.

Final plans

In November 2019, Genting Group announced that the opening would be delayed until summer 2021 due to upgraded plans for the resort. The plans increased the project's cost from $4 billion to $4.3 billion, making it the most expensive resort property ever developed in Las Vegas. The increased budget included plans for a 5,000-seat theater, a  nightclub and day club for a younger demographic, and 100 additional hotel rooms for a total of 3,500. Additional convention space was also added to the design, along with a pool complex. Sibella said the resort would have only a minimal Asian theme to appeal to a broader demographic. A third of the acreage will be left vacant for the possible expansion of the resort in the future. An unfinished portion of the Echelon project, located at the property's northwest corner, would be included in the potential expansion.

In February 2020, it was announced that Resorts World had partnered with Hilton Hotels. Through the deal, a portion of the hotel would be branded as Hilton, while other areas would be marketed under two of Hilton's other brands, LXR Hotels and Conrad Hotels. The Hilton name would provide brand recognition and help attract guests to the resort, as Genting had few U.S. properties by comparison.

The COVID-19 pandemic occurred in 2020 during construction, having various effects in Nevada. At least seven construction workers at Resorts World tested positive for COVID-19, and various safety precautions were put in place to protect workers from contracting the virus. The pandemic also created some difficulty in acquiring building materials. Although construction slowed down because of the pandemic, the project was still expected to be completed on time.

As of June 2020, the project was 65-percent completed. That month, Resorts World sought county approval to have The Boring Company build an underground people mover tunnel, leading from the resort to the Las Vegas Convention Center, which was in the midst of an expansion. The Boring Company was already building an underground people mover system for the convention center, and the additional tunnel to Resorts World would be an extension, allowing people to quickly travel between the two locations via Tesla shuttles. The proposal was approved by the Clark County Commission two months later, with construction expected to begin by the end of 2020. A target demographic for the resort would be convention-goers. Resorts World had reached 90-percent completion as of March 2021.

Opening
A VIP party was held for invited guests on the night of June 24, 2021, followed by the public opening at 11:00 p.m. Opening ceremonies included a fireworks show, and a lion and dragon dance. The opening night attracted 20,000 people, including 5,500 at the VIP party. Celebrities were among people who attended the opening. The hotel opened the next day, and a grand opening celebration took place during the Fourth of July weekend, with Miley Cyrus performing. The resort opened with 95 percent of its amenities, excluding features such as the theater, a spa, a nightclub, and the underground tunnel. At the time of opening, Genting announced that it was already planning an expansion on the resort's unused acreage.

The property is the first new resort to be completed on the Las Vegas Strip since the Cosmopolitan, which opened in 2010. Resorts World was expected to employ approximately 6,000 people. Because of high unemployment caused by the pandemic, more than 130,000 people applied for jobs at the resort. The property is expected to help revitalize the northern Las Vegas Strip, where several large projects had failed to materialize. A few months after opening, Resorts World partnered with Hotels.com to feature the latter's Captain Obvious character in an advertising campaign for the property.

The underground Tesla tunnel was opened in June 2022.

Features
Resorts World Las Vegas is an Asian-themed property. It includes a  casino, with 1,400 slot machines, 117 table games, a poker room, and a sportsbook. The resort has various technological features. It accepts cryptocurrency through a partnership with Gemini, and the casino floor offers optional cashless wagering at slots and table games, with the use of a mobile wallet. The resort partnered with five companies, including Konami Gaming and International Game Technology, to provide cashless wagering. In addition, table game chips use RFID technology for tracking purposes, as part of the resort's loyalty program. Resorts World is a non-smoking property aside from its casino.

The property includes The District, a  retail center spread across two floors. It has various retailers, including several Fred Segal stores. One of the Fred Segal stores is cashier-less and instead utilizes Amazon's "Just Walk Out" technology, automatically detecting items taken from the store and charging customers' credit cards. Another store, Kardashian Kloset, sells clothing formerly owned by the Kardashian family. The District also contains several of the resort's restaurants, and The Globe, an LED video globe measuring 50 feet in diameter. The Globe stands 40 feet high and has 8,640 triangular LED panels which project interactive images. It contains 20 million pixels.

Other features include  of meeting and banquet space, a  pool complex with nine pools, and a spa. It is expected that 75 percent of the resort's revenue will come from non-gaming options such as live entertainment and restaurants. The property is decorated with thousands of trees, 100 of which were salvaged from the Stardust.

Hotels

The resort includes a 59-story hotel building with a total of 3,506 rooms, divided across three Hilton-affiliated hotels. It is the largest Hilton hotel property in the world. Among the hotels is the Las Vegas Hilton at Resorts World, with 1,774 rooms. The resort also contains the largest Conrad hotel in the world – Conrad Las Vegas at Resorts World – with 1,496 rooms. Another portion of the hotel building, with the remaining 236 rooms, is branded as the high-end Crockfords Las Vegas – part of LXR Hotel & Resorts. The hotel setup allows the resort to cater to different types of guests, with Crockfords offering the highest level of luxury.

Each hotel has its own lobby, and the Conrad lobby features three robotic AIBO puppies which greet guests. The hotels feature keyless room entry, by using Bluetooth through a guest's smartphone. A digital concierge service, known as Red, is accessible through a mobile app and the resort's website, allowing guests to make reservations, ask questions, and check in and out of the hotel. The hotel tower's exterior contains 1.2 million square feet of red-colored metal panels and bronze glass. The tower does not include a fourth floor, as "four" is considered an unlucky number in many Asian countries.

The west hotel tower has a  exterior LED screen, measuring 294 feet in height and 340 feet in width. It took seven months to construct. The LED screen faces south, and is made of a somewhat-transparent aluminum mesh, allowing hotel guests to still see outside their windows. In addition to promoting the resort, the screens will also provide paid advertising through a partnership with Clear Channel Outdoor.

Entertainment
The resort has  of entertainment space, including The Theatre at Resorts World, a music venue with capacity for up to 4,700 people. The theater was designed by Scéno Plus, and is operated by AEG Presents. It contains one of the largest and tallest stages on the Las Vegas Strip.

The theater was built in the center of the resort for easy access. It has hosted residencies by various singers, including Carrie Underwood. She was the first musician to perform in the theater, which opened on December 1, 2021. Celine Dion was previously scheduled to open the venue, but had to postpone her residency due to muscle spasms. Other entertainers with residency shows include singers Luke Bryan and Michael Bublé, as well as magician David Blaine. It has also been host to a residency by Katy Perry, known as Play, which opened in 2021.

An outdoor pool venue, known as Ayu Dayclub, features a Southeast Asian island theme. Singapore-based company Zouk Group will also open a Zouk-branded nightclub, marking its first U.S. location. Zedd and Tiësto will serve as the resident DJs for both clubs. Zouk will have other residencies as well, including one for rapper Jack Harlow.

Restaurants and bars
Resorts World has more than 40 restaurants and bars, including the  Carversteak by businessman Sean Christie. Zouk also operates a social gaming bar called RedTail and an Asian restaurant called Fuhu.

The resort includes an indoor food street known as Famous Food Street Eats, which has 16 food stalls. The food street was co-developed by Zouk, and it features Western and Southeast Asian food. Steve Aoki and Marcus Samuelsson are among those who will open eateries at the food street, which measures . The entrance features a 10-foot-tall lucky cat sculpture, made by artist Red Hong Yi using gold coins.

Resorts World also includes Wally's, a  wine bar and restaurant. The  Gatsby's Cocktail Lounge provides wraparound views of the casino floor. The hotel tower includes a lounge known as Starlight, a reference to the Stardust.

Resorts World's room service is provided by Grubhub, making it the first resort to partner with the company.

References

External links

 

2021 establishments in Nevada
Casinos completed in 2021
Casino hotels
Casinos in the Las Vegas Valley
Hotel buildings completed in 2021
Hotels established in 2021
Las Vegas Strip
Resorts in the Las Vegas Valley
Skyscraper hotels in Winchester, Nevada
Shopping malls established in 2021